Sir George Foster Pearce KCVO (14 January 1870 – 24 June 1952) was an Australian politician who served as a Senator for Western Australia from 1901 to 1938. He began his career in the Labor Party but later joined the National Labor Party, the Nationalist Party, and the United Australia Party; he served as a cabinet minister under prime ministers from all four parties.

Pearce was born in Mount Barker, South Australia. He left school at the age of 11 and trained as a carpenter, later moving to Western Australia and becoming involved in the union movement. He helped establish the Labor Party there, and in 1901 – aged 31 – was elected to the new federal parliament. Pearce was elevated to cabinet in 1908, under Andrew Fisher, and served in each of Fisher's three governments. He continued on in cabinet when Billy Hughes became prime minister in 1915, and after the Labor Party split of 1916 followed Hughes to the National Labor Party and then to the Nationalists. Pearce also served in cabinet under Stanley Bruce and, after joining the UAP in 1931, Joseph Lyons. He was Minister for Defence from 1908 to 1909, 1910 to 1913, 1914 to 1921, and 1932 to 1934. His 24 years in cabinet and 37 years as a senator are both records.

Early life
Pearce was born in Mount Barker, South Australia, the fifth of eleven children born to Jane (née Foster) and James Pearce. His father was a blacksmith of Cornish descent, while his mother was born in London. An uncle, George Pearce, briefly served in the South Australian House of Assembly. Pearce grew up in the small town of Redhill, attending the local public school. He left school at the age of 11 and began working as a farm labourer, but later secured a carpentry apprenticeship. He moved to Adelaide once he completed his training, but struggled to find work during the economic downturn of the early 1890s.

In 1893, Pearce moved to Coolgardie, Western Australia, to take advantage of the gold rush, working as a prospector with little success. He later settled in Perth and resumed his work as a carpenter, joining the Amalgamated Society of Carpenters and Joiners. He became prominent in the local labour movement, and in 1897 led a strike on building sites that led to him being blacklisted for several weeks. On 4 April 1897, Pearce married Eliza Maud Barrett at Trinity Church, Perth. They had two sons and two daughters together. His great-granddaughter Jane Prentice was elected to federal parliament in 2010.

Political career

In 1893, Pearce helped found the Progressive Political League, a precursor to the Western Australian branch of the ALP. He was elected to the Subiaco Municipal Council in 1898. Self-educated in politics and economics, in 1901 he was elected to the first Commonwealth Parliament as a Senator for Western Australia. He narrowly missed out on being a member of the first Labor Party Cabinet when Chris Watson became Prime Minister in 1904. Pearce was Chairman of Committees in the Senate from 1907 to 1908.

In 1908, Pearce was elected to cabinet by the ALP caucus as a member of the first Fisher Ministry. He had long shown an interest in defence matters in the Senate and was chosen by Prime Minister Andrew Fisher to become Minister for Defence. He believed it was his duty as minister to accept "any reasonable expenditure on armament, ammunition, and accoutrements" recommended by his advisers and to resolve disagreements between sections of the military. During his first term as minister, Pearce ordered three River-class torpedo-boat destroyers for the what would become the Royal Australian Navy.

Pearce regained the defence portfolio in the second Fisher Ministry (1910–1913). During his second term as minister, he was responsible for the Naval Defence Act 1910, which created the Australian Commonwealth Naval Board and the Royal Australian Naval College. He attended the 1911 Imperial Conference in London where the relationship between the Royal Navy and Royal Australian Navy was determined. He oversaw the implementation of the Universal Service Scheme of compulsory military training scheme, and in 1912 approved the creation of the Central Flying School at Point Cook, Victoria, which became the "birthplace of Australian military aviation".

World War I

In 1914, Australia entered World War I. Upon Billy Hughes' ascension as Prime Minister, Pearce was named Deputy Leader of the party.

Pearce served as acting prime minister from January to August 1916, while Hughes was in England and France. He was the first senator to hold the position, and the only senator to do so until Bill Spooner in 1962. Outside of the defence portfolio, Pearce oversaw the creation of Advisory Council of Science and Industry, the predecessor of the CSIRO, which Hughes had approved before his departure. In March 1916, he used the War Precautions Act 1914 to set price controls on bread and flour in metropolitan areas. On 6 July he extended this to all other foods, and on 20 July he created the Necessary Commodities Commission with the power to set prices on any item.

By the time of Hughes' return, Australia's prosecution of the war made the introduction of conscription an intensely divisive issue for the ALP. Pearce was convinced of the necessity of introducing conscription, but the majority of his party did not agree. Pearce, along with many other of the party's founding members, subsequently followed Hughes out of the party and into the new "National Labor Party."  A few months later, the National Labor Party merged with the Commonwealth Liberal Party to form the Nationalist Party, with Hughes as its leader.

Post-war politics

Most of the defectors to the Nationalists subsequently faded into obscurity, but Pearce went on to have a successful career in the party of his erstwhile opponents. After Hughes was deposed as Nationalist leader, Pearce accepted a position in the ministry of Hughes' successor and rival, Stanley Bruce. As Minister for Home and Territories he showed a particular interest in the Northern Territory and was "the driving force" behind its division in 1927 into separate territories of Central Australia and North Australia. It was reversed by the Scullin Government in 1931. He became the first Father of the Senate in 1923.  He was appointed a Knight Commander of the Royal Victorian Order (KCVO) in 1927.

In 1932, Pearce joined the newly formed United Australia Party, and served as a minister in the government of Joseph Lyons until his defeat at the 1937 election (his term ended in June 1938). Pearce campaigned for the "No" vote in the 1933 Western Australian secession referendum, touring the state with Lyons and Tom Brennan for two weeks. The "Yes" vote won almost a two-thirds majority, but ultimately secession did not occur. At the 1937 federal election, Pearce's candidacy was opposed by the Wheatgrowers' Union and the Dominion League of Western Australia, a leading secessionist organisation. The "Put Pearce Last" campaign was successful, and his term ended at the end of June 1938. He was a senator for 37 years and three months, a record term.  His total service as a minister was 24 years and seven months, also a record in the Australian Parliament.

Later life
Pearce made no attempts to re-enter parliament after his defeat. He served on the Commonwealth Grants Commission from 1939 to 1944, and as chairman of the Defence Board of Business Administration from 1940 until it was abolished in 1947. Prime Minister John Curtin retained him in the latter position despite the opposition of some within the Labor Party, including Arthur Calwell and Eddie Ward. The board supervised all defence expenditure of over £10,000.

Pearce had lived mainly in Melbourne since entering the Senate, but co-owned a farm in Tenterden, Western Australia, with his son and visited regularly. He published an autobiography, Carpenter to Cabinet, in 1951, which had been written over a decade earlier. Pearce died at his home in Elwood on 24 June 1952, aged 82. At the time of his death, he was the last surviving member of the first Australian Senate elected at Federation in 1901; MHRs Billy Hughes and King O'Malley from the First Parliament would outlive him.

Legacy
Places named in Pearce's honour include RAAF Base Pearce and the electoral Division of Pearce in Western Australia, Pearce Peak in Antarctica, and the Canberra suburb of Pearce.

Australia's longest-serving prime minister Robert Menzies wrote the introduction to Peter Heydon's 1965 biography of Pearce, Quiet Decision, and recalled that he had "never sat with an abler man than George Pearce" in cabinet. Menzies praised Pearce's "profound and reflective mind", analytical way of thinking, and ability to express ideas and policy recommendations.

References

Further reading

External links

 

 

1870 births
1952 deaths
Australian Labor Party members of the Parliament of Australia
Australian ministers for Foreign Affairs
Australian people of Cornish descent
Nationalist Party of Australia members of the Parliament of Australia
United Australia Party members of the Parliament of Australia
Members of the Australian Senate for Western Australia
Members of the Australian Senate
Members of the Cabinet of Australia
Australian federationists
Australian Knights Commander of the Royal Victorian Order
Australian politicians awarded knighthoods
Australian members of the Privy Council of the United Kingdom
Officiers of the Légion d'honneur
Australian carpenters
National Labor Party members of the Parliament of Australia
Defence ministers of Australia
20th-century Australian politicians
People from Mount Barker, South Australia